The 2022 Ontario Tankard, (known as the Port Elgin Chrysler '22 Ontario Tankard Presented by Bruce Power for sponsorship reasons), the provincial men's curling championship for Southern Ontario, was held from February 9 to 13 at The Plex in Port Elgin, Ontario. The winning Howard team represented Ontario at the 2022 Tim Hortons Brier, Canada's national men's curling championship in Lethbridge, Alberta.

The event was expected to attract around 9,000 spectators, and to bring a $1,000,000 to the local economy. Bruce County contributed $5,000 cash and $5,000 in-kind for sponsorship, with revenues expected to contribute to improving the local Port Elgin Curling Club, which is playing host to the event (but is not the host venue).

Team Howard, skipped by Scott Howard, won in the final, defeating the defending champion John Epping rink. Team Howard's normal skip, Glenn Howard (Scott's father) missed the event due to a knee injury. Spare Adam Spencer filled in as third on the team, which also consisted of David Mathers and Tim March. Epping took control early in the final, going up 3–1 after 2 ends, but team Howard remained patient, blanking the next four ends, before Scott Howard made a double in the 7th to tie the game. Epping blanked the eighth, but narrowly missed a blank opportunity in 9th, giving up a steal of one. In the tenth, Howard made a double to lie two on his last. Epping attempted to respond with a double of his own, but missed, giving up another steal, losing the game 5–3. In total, there were about 500 fans on hand to watch the game, which was described as "electric" by Glenn Howard, in a game that was played amidst changing regulations due to the COVID-19 pandemic in Ontario.

Qualification process
Originally, eight teams were to qualify, two from a cash spiel qualifier, three from an open qualifier, the top two southern Ontario teams in the CTRS standings (December 1, 2021), and one from the "Trillium Tour Series", the top team from a series of Ontario Curling Tour events (as of December 20, 2021). 

On January 24, 2022, CurlON decided to expand the field to 12 teams, as it could not hold the open qualifier due to the COVID-19 pandemic in Ontario. It invited the next top 7 teams on the CTRS ranking who were in the qualifiers.

Teams
The team lineups are as follows:

Knockout Draw Brackets
The draw is listed as follows:

A Event

B Event

C Event

Scores

Draw 1
February 9, 7:30pm

Draw 2
February 10, 9:30am

Draw 3
February 10, 2:30pm

Draw 4
February 10, 7:30pm

Draw 5
February 11, 9:30am

Draw 6
February 11, 2:30pm

Draw 7
February 11, 7:30pm

Draw 8
February 12, 9:30am

Playoffs

A vs. B
February 12, 2:30pm

C1 vs. C2
February 12, 7:30pm

Semifinal
February 13, 9:30am

Final
February 13, 2:30pm

Qualification

CurlON CashSpiel
December 17–19, CC of Collingwood, Collingwood

Notes

References

Bruce County
Ontario Tankard
Ontario Tankard
Ontario Tankard
2022 Tim Hortons Brier